Final Justice (最后判决) is a 1997 Hong Kong film directed by Chiu Sung Kee and produced by Johnnie To.

Cast and roles
 Chan Lung - Chi-Lone
 Lau Ching-Wan - Father Lee (Ho)
 Carman Lee - Koo May
 Danny Lee
 Eric Tsang - Kim Shun-Fat
 Tse Kwan-Ho		
 Almen Wong Pui-Ha - Donna Cheung

External links
 IMDb entry

Hong Kong drama films
1996 films
Milkyway Image films
1990s Hong Kong films